The Champions Chess Tour 2022, known for sponsorship reasons as the Meltwater Champions Chess Tour, was a 9-month series of nine online chess tournaments featuring some of the world's top players, who played for a prize money pool of US$1.6 million. The tour started on February 19, 2022 and lasted until November 20, 2022.

Schedule 
There are 9 tournaments in the tour: 6 labelled as Regular and 3 labelled as Major.

Format 

The format was similar to that of the previous season, with some innovations.

Qualification

Regular 

Each Regular tournament had 16 participants. In all Regular tournaments but the first, the top 8 players from the previous tournament (Regular or Major) were invited. The remaining spots were filled by wildcards chosen by the organizer.

Major 

Each Major tournament had 8 participants: the top two players of each of the previous two Regular tournaments, the top two players in the overall tour standings, and two wildcards. The tour regulations did not specify what happens if these groups of players overlap.

Time controls 

Three different time controls were used in the tour:

 In rapid games, each player has 15 minutes, plus a 10-second increment for each move.
 In blitz games, each player has 5 minutes, plus a 3-second increment for each move.
 In Armageddon games, White has 5 minutes and Black has 4 minutes, with no increment.

Stages

Regular 

Each Regular tournament consisted of a preliminary stage with 15 rounds and a knockout stage with three rounds. In the preliminary stage, 16 players participated in a round-robin spanning four days, with each player playing one rapid game against each other player, for a total of 120 games. In contrast to the previous season, a win scores 3 points and a draw scores 1 point. The eight players with the most points advance to the next stage. Ties are resolved according to the following criteria, in that order:

 Result in the game(s) between the tied players
 Number of wins (including forfeits)
 Sonneborn–Berger score
 Koya score

In the quarterfinals and semifinals, each matchup consists of four rapid games played on a single day, with one point for a win and half a point for a draw. Ties are resolved by a playoff consisting of two blitz games. If these also end in a tie, an Armageddon game is played; if this ends in a draw, the Black player wins the round. The player who ranked higher in the preliminary stage gets to pick a colour.

The final consists of two matches of four rapid games each, played on successive days. Each match is scored separately. A tie (if each player wins one match or both matches are tied) is resolved as in the other knockout rounds. There is no match for third place.

Major 

Each Major tournament will be a round-robin tournament among eight players, without a knockout stage. Each pair of players plays a match of four rapid games as in the knockout stage of Regular tournaments, including blitz and Armageddon tie-breaks if necessary. If the match is decided in the rapid games, the winner gets 3 match points; if it is decided in tie-breaks, the winner gets 2 match points and the loser 1 match point. Ties in the total match points at the end of the tournament are resolved according to the following criteria, in that order:

 Result in the match(es) between the tied players
 Number of match wins (including forfeits)

Tour points and prize money 
There is no longer a distinction between tour points and prize money as in the previous season. The player who accumulates the most prize money over the course of the tour wins the tour. The winner is awarded an additional $50,000.

Regular 
The total prize pool for a Regular tournament is $150,000, of which $60,000 are distributed as follows:

In other words, $2,000 are awarded for reaching the quarterfinals, $4,000 for winning a quarterfinal, $9,000 for winning a semifinal and $10,000 for winning a final.

The remaining $90,000 can be won in the preliminary stage, with $250 being awarded per point, that is, $750 for a win and $250 for a draw. The remaining $250 in case of a draw accumulate in a bonus pot that starts out with $20,000 and is used for performance awards at the end of the season.

Major 

The total prize pool for a Major tournament is $210,000, with $2,500 being awarded for each match point. A player with less than 2 match points nevertheless receives $5,000, but only the prize money earned with match points is included in the tour standings.

Results

Tournament results

Tour rankings 
Prize money is shown in thousands of US dollars. An asterisk denotes a Major tournament.

The bonus pot, which started off with $20,000, has grown to $61,250 due to 165 draws in preliminary stages.

Tournaments

Airthings Masters

This initial tournament started on February 19 and ended on February 26.

Preliminary stage

Knockout stage

Charity Cup

This tournament started on March 19 and ended on March 26.

Preliminary stage

Knockout stage

Oslo Esports Cup

This tournament started on April 22 and ended on April 28. For each match, the table shows the match points gained, with the match result in parentheses.

Chessable Masters

This tournament started on May 19 and ended on May 26.

Preliminary stage

Knockout stage

FTX Road to Miami

This tournament started on July 10 and ended on July 17.

Preliminary stage

Teimour Radjabov played five rounds of the preliminary stage and then withdrew due to a COVID-19 infection and general ill health. His games, including the ones he had already played, were forfeited, and his opponents received the full 3 points and corresponding prize money.

Knockout stage

FTX Crypto Cup

The FTX Crypto Cup began on the 15th August and concluded on the 21st August. Similarly to the Oslo Esports Cup, the players faced one of their 7 rivals each day over seven rounds in round-robin play. Each match consisted of 4 rapid games (15 minutes per player and a 10-second increment); if the match was tied, there was a playoff with two blitz games (5 minutes per player and a 3-second increment) and if the match was still tied, there would be a final 'Armageddon' game. Magnus Carlsen finished clear first with 16/21 points, with R Praggnanandhaa as the runner-up on 15/21 points and Alireza Firouzja as the third place finisher also on 15/21 points - edged out by Praggnanandhaa due to tiebreak rules.

Julius Baer Generation Cup

This tournament started on September 18 and concluded on September 25. 

Magnus Carlsen resigned after making his first move in his game against Hans Niemann. He has hinted that Niemann may have cheated in his previous game between the two grandmasters.

Preliminary stage

Knockout stage

Aimchess Rapid

This tournament started on October 14 and concluded on October 21.

Preliminary stage

Knockout stage

Tour Finals

The Tour Finals began on the 14th November and concluded on the 20th November. Similarly to the Oslo Esports Cup, the players faced one of their 7 rivals each day over seven rounds in round-robin play. Each match consisted of 4 rapid games (15 minutes per player and a 10-second increment); if the match was tied, there was a playoff with two blitz games (5 minutes per player and a 3-second increment) and if the match was still tied, there would be a final 'Armageddon' game.

References 

Chess competitions
2022 in chess